Cryptandra arbutiflora, commonly known as waxy cryptandra, is a species of flowering plant in the family Rhamnaceae and is endemic to the southwest of Western Australia. It is a shrub with spiny branches, elliptic to linear leaves and tube-shaped white flowers.

Description

Taxonomy
This species was first formally described by botanist Eduard Fenzl based on plant material collected by Charles von Hügel from the Swan River area. Fenzl's description was published in 1837 in Enumeratio plantarum quas in Novae Hollandiae ora austro-occidentali ad fluvium Cygnorum et in sinu Regis Georgii collegit Carolus Liber Baro de Hügel. The Latin specific epithet arbutiflora alludes to the flowers which are reminiscent of those of Arbutus unedo, the strawberry tree.

Four varieties are currently accepted by the Australian Plant Census:
Cryptandra arbutiflora var. borealis Rye has curved stem hairs and scattered large star-shaped hairs on the fruit.

A former variety C. arbutiflora var. intermedia is now regarded as a species in its own right - Cryptandra intermedia.

Distribution and habitat
Cryptandra arbutiflora occurs between the south coast and the Dandaragan area to the north and also near Geraldton. It grows in a variety of soils on granite outcrps, breakaways and creek banks.

The variety arbutiflora is found in the Gillingarra to Mount Barker and Jerramungup areas, var. borealis from Kalbarri to the Chapman River, var. pygmaea near Lake Muir, and var. tubulosa from Perth to the Kent River.

Conservation status
Three varieties of C. arbutiflora are listed as "not threatened" by the Western Australian Government Department of Biodiversity, Conservation and Attractions but var. pygmaea is classified as "Priority Three" by the Government of Western Australia Department of Biodiversity, Conservation and Attractions, meaning that it is poorly known and known from only a few locations but is not under imminent threat.

References

arbutiflora
Rosales of Australia
Rosids of Western Australia
Taxa named by Eduard Fenzl
Plants described in 1837